The 2016 Pac-12 Conference men's soccer season was the 17th season of men's varsity soccer in the conference.

The Stanford Cardinal are the defending champions, by virtue of winning the regular season (there is no conference tournament). The Cardinal are also the defending NCAA champions.

Changes from 2015 

 None

Teams

Stadiums and locations 

 Arizona, Arizona State, Colorado, Oregon, USC, Utah and Washington State do not sponsor men's soccer. San Diego State is an associated member.

Regular season

Results 

Each team plays every other conference team twice; once home and once away.

Rankings

National

Far West Regional

Postseason

NCAA tournament

All-Pac-12 awards and teams

See also 
 2016 NCAA Division I men's soccer season
 2016 Pac-12 Conference women's soccer season

References 

 
2016 NCAA Division I men's soccer season